Faux-la-Montagne is a commune in the Creuse department in the Nouvelle-Aquitaine region in central France.

Geography
On its southern and eastern sides, the commune borders the department of Corrèze and is within the national park of the Millevaches (not 1000 cows, but lakes).

Population

Sights
 The twelfth-century church.
 Two chapels.
 A dolmen at Landoras
 The Lac de Vassivière and the dam, built in 1952.
 Two châteaux, at the hamlets of La Feuillade and Thézillat.

See also
Communes of the Creuse department

References

Communes of Creuse